Scott Douglas Sanderson (July 22, 1956 – April 11, 2019) was an American professional baseball pitcher. He played in Major League Baseball (MLB) for the Montreal Expos, Chicago Cubs, Oakland Athletics, New York Yankees, California Angels, San Francisco Giants, and Chicago White Sox. Following his retirement from playing professional baseball he worked as a sports agent and radio broadcaster.

Early life 
Sanderson attended Glenbrook North High School in Northbrook, Illinois, and Vanderbilt University. Sanderson pitched in only 28 minor league games before being called up to the major leagues.

Career

MLB career
Sanderson went 4–2 in nine starts in his rookie season with the Expos in 1978, posting a 2.51 ERA.

The Expos dealt him to the Cubs in a three-way team trade in December 1983.

He pitched in the 1990 World Series as a member of the Oakland Athletics, making two relief appearances as Oakland was swept by the Cincinnati Reds in four games.

The following season, however, he had a league-worst 4.93 earned run average.

Work as an agent
Sanderson became an agent after the end of his time as a professional baseball player. Sanderson's agency has offices in Atlanta and in his hometown of Chicago, where he spent the majority of his time. His clients included, at one time or another, Frank Thomas, Josh Beckett, and Lance Berkman.

Broadcasting
In 1997, Sanderson briefly filled in as a radio commentator during Cubs broadcasts on WGN (AM).  In August 1997, Sanderson worked two weekend games of Cubs broadcasts on WGN as a color commentator with radio play-by-play man Pat Hughes while Cubs color commentator Ron Santo was sidelined by inflamed vocal cords.

Personal 
Sanderson was married with two children, a son and a daughter. He also enjoyed playing in golf tournaments around the United States. 
In his later years, Sanderson had his voice box removed and suffered a stroke. He died from cancer on April 11, 2019, aged 62.

References

External links

Sanderson's second career

1956 births
2019 deaths
Águilas del Zulia players
American expatriate baseball players in Venezuela
American businesspeople
American expatriate baseball players in Canada
American League All-Stars
Baseball players at the 1975 Pan American Games
Baseball players from Michigan
California Angels players
Chicago Cubs announcers
Chicago Cubs players
Chicago White Sox players
Deaths from cancer in Illinois
Denver Bears players
Iowa Cubs players
Lake Elsinore Storm players
Lodi Crushers players
Major League Baseball broadcasters
Major League Baseball pitchers
Memphis Chicks players
Montreal Expos players
New York Yankees players
Oakland Athletics players
Pan American Games medalists in baseball
Pan American Games silver medalists for the United States
Peoria Chiefs players
San Francisco Giants players
Sportspeople from Dearborn, Michigan
Vanderbilt Commodores baseball players
West Palm Beach Expos players
Medalists at the 1975 Pan American Games
Alaska Goldpanners of Fairbanks players